"Ahora Es" (English: It's Now) is the third single by reggaeton duo Wisin & Yandel from their sixth studio album Wisin vs. Yandel: Los Extraterrestres, released in March 2008, by Machete Music. The melody resembles the song "Ay Cosita Linda" by Pacho Galan.

Charts

Weekly charts

Year-end charts

Accolades

American Society of Composers, Authors, and Publishers Awards

|-
|rowspan="1" scope="row"|2009
|Ahora Es
|Urban Song of the Year
|
|-

References

2007 singles
Wisin & Yandel songs
Spanish-language songs
Music videos directed by Jessy Terrero
Machete Music singles
2007 songs
Songs written by Wisin
Songs written by Yandel
Songs written by Nesty (producer)